CSCC may refer to:
 Canadian Society of Clinical Chemists, a professional association
 Center for Strategic Counterterrorism Communications, a US State Department agency
 Chattanooga State Community College, a community college in Chattanooga, Tennessee, United States
 Columbia-Southern Chemical Corporation, a chemical company
 Columbus State Community College, a community college in Ohio, United States
 Cleveland State Community College, a community college in Tennessee, United States
 Creek Street Christian College, P–12 college in Bendigo, Australia
 Cutaneous squamous cell carcinoma, that is, squamous cell skin cancer

See also
 CCSC (disambiguation)